Glittering Days is a 2009 Chinese comedy-drama film directed by An Jianjun and starring Jin Yaqin, Liu Hua, Xin Baiqing, Feng Qian, Liu Lin, and Wu Yue. It is produced jointly by Beijing Forbidden City Film Co.,Ltd. and CCTV-6. It is a remake of the 2002 drama of the same name by Li Longyun. The film tells about the housing dispute between three brothers and their mother in Beijing. The film premiered in China on September 1, 2009 to mark the 60th anniversary of the People's Republic of China.

Cast
 Jin Yaqin as Mother He, a 70-years-old woman who has three sons.
 Feng Qian as He Laoda, the oldest son of Mother He, the adviser of a craft enterprise, he has a daughter named He Yue.
 Liu Hua as He Lao'er, the second son of Mother He, he loves to collect antiques.
 Xin Baiqing as He Laosan, the third son of Mother He.
 Liu Lin as Liu Yulan, a shop assistant and the wife of He Lao'er.
 Wu Yue as Zhang Meng, a literary editor and the wife of He Laosan.
 Liu Jinshan as Rou Gulu, an idler.
 Huang Haibing as Jia Ming, an artist.
 Wang Changli as Tian Zhengfu
 Wu Chao as Yang Qiulin
 Wu Xiaodan as He Yue, a white collar worker and the daughter of He Laoda.
 Gao Dongping as Mao Zi, a Taxi driver.
 Naren Hua as Ya Zhen
 An Chengtao as Xiao Wei
 Song Chunli as the district chief
 Li Tiejun as the director
 Shao Bo as the developer
 Li Jianjun as the policeman

Soundtrack

Production
An Jianjun was signed to direct the film from a script by Li Longyun and Niu Fuzhi. It is based on the 2002 drama of the same name by Li Longyun.

Production started on 13 December 2008 and ended in July 2008.

Release
Glittering Days was released on September 1, 2009 in China.

References

External links
 
 
 

2009 films
2000s Mandarin-language films
2009 comedy-drama films
Chinese comedy-drama films
Films set in Beijing
Films shot in Beijing